The men's long jump event at the 1989 Summer Universiade was held at the Wedaustadion in Duisburg on 25 and 27 August 1989.

Medalists

Results

Qualification
Qualifying distance: 7.55 metres

Final

References

Athletics at the 1989 Summer Universiade
1989